Mairbek is a Chechen male given name. Notable people with the name include:

 Mairbek Sheripov (1905–1942), Chechen leader
 Mairbek Taisumov (born 1988), Chechen mixed martial artist
 Mairbek Vatchagaev (born 1965), Chechen historian and political analyst

Masculine given names